Bette Lou Talvacchia (born 1951) is an American art historian and educator. Talvacchia is the Board of Trustees Distinguished Professor of Art History Emeritus at the University of Connecticut.

Career
Talvacchia earned a Master of Arts in Art History from the University of Texas at Austin in 1975. There, she wrote a thesis on the Italian Futurist artists Giacomo Balla and Filippo Tommaso Marinetti. Talvacchia then continued on to Stanford University to receive a Doctor of Philosophy in Art History in 1981. Her doctoral dissertation was on the work of Giulio Romano from the Ducal Palace in Mantua, under the supervision of Professor Kurt Forster.

A scholar of Renaissance art, Talvacchia has taught at the University of Connecticut since graduating from Stanford. She is now the Board of Trustees Distinguished Professor of Art History Emeritus at the University of Connecticut. Talvacchia has been a Fellow of Villa I Tatti, operated by Harvard University. In 2003, she was awarded a Faculty Excellence in Research Award.

From 2016 to 2019, Talvacchia served a stint as the Director of the School of Visual Arts at the University of Oklahoma, succeeding Mary Jo Watson.

See also
List of Stanford University people
List of University of Connecticut people
List of University of Texas at Austin alumni

References

External links
New York Studio School lecture

1951 births
Living people
21st-century American women
American art historians
Women art historians
University of Texas at Austin alumni
Stanford University alumni
University of Connecticut faculty
University of Oklahoma faculty